The Haggard family is an English family associated with Bradenham Hall in Norfolk that was involved in several areas of public life. Members include:

 John Haggard (1794-1856), lawyer, father of Mark and great-uncle of Henry
 Mark Haggard (1825-1854), clergyman and rower, son of John
 Sir Henry Rider Haggard (1856-1925), writer, great-nephew of John and father of Lilias
 Sir Vernon Harry Stuart Haggard (1874-1960), naval officer, nephew of Henry, brother of Godfrey and father of Hugh
 Sir Godfrey Digby Napier Haggard (1884-1969), diplomat, nephew of Henry, brother of Vernon, father of Stephen and grandfather of Piers
 Lilias Margitson Rider Haggard, (1892-1968), writer, daughter of Henry
 Hugh Alfred Vernon Haggard (1908-1991), naval officer, son of Vernon
 Stephen Hubert Avenel Haggard (1911-1943), actor and writer, son of Godfrey and father of Piers
 Piers Inigo Haggard (born 1939), theater and film director, son of Stephen and grandson of Godfrey

References

English families
Haggard family